The rostromedial tegmental nucleus (RMTg), also known as the tail of the ventral tegmental area (tVTA), is a GABAergic nucleus which functions as a "master brake" for the midbrain dopamine system. This region as been discovered by the researchers, M. Barrot, J.Kaufling and T. Jhou.  It is poorly differentiated from the rest of the ventral tegmental area (VTA) and possesses robust functional and structural links to the dopamine pathways.  Notably, both acute and chronic exposure to psychostimulants have been shown to induce FosB and ΔFosB expression in the RMTg; no other drug type has been shown to induce these proteins in the RMTg.

Inputs
The RMTg receives incoming projections from the following structures:
Medial prefrontal cortex
Cingulate cortex
Preoptic area
Lateral hypothalamus
Lateral habenula
Superior colliculus
Periaqueductal gray
Dorsal raphe
Laterodorsal tegmental nucleus
Substantia nigra
Nucleus accumbens
Pontine tegmentum
Ventral pallidum

Outputs
GABA projections from the RMTg include:
RMTg → Raphe nuclei
RMTg → Preoptic area
RMTg → Lateral hypothalamus
RMTg → Substantia nigra
RMTg → VTA
RMTg → Periaqueductal gray
RMTg → Pontine tegmentum

Clinical significance

The RMTg plays a "crucial role" in the regulation of dopaminergic neuronal activity in the central nervous system by endogenous opioids and opiate drugs. The GABAergic neurons that project from the RMTg to the midbrain dopaminergic nuclei (i.e., the ventral tegmental area and substantia nigra pars compacta) express μ-opioid receptors. Current evidence suggests that exogenous opiates (e.g., morphine and heroin) excite the dopamine pathways originating in the VTA by activating the μ-opioid receptors in neurons projecting from the RMTg; opioid activation of these neurons leads to disinhibition of the GABAergic brake on dopamine networks. Since RMTg projections to the VTA are the primary inhibitor of the dopaminergic pathways that are implicated in addiction (e.g., the mesolimbic pathway), the RMTg plays a significant role in the development of opiate addictions.

Psychostimulants have been shown to increase expression of the FosB and ΔFosB in the RMTg;  the effects of stimulant-induced increases in ΔFosB expression in the RMTg are not known.

Notes

References

Midbrain